The  is a regional railway line in Saga Prefecture, Japan, owned and operated by Kyushu Railway Company (JR Kyushu). The line was originally constructed to carry coal from the Karatsu coal fields to the Port of Karatsu for export and had many branch lines to coal mines which have since closed.

Operation
All trains running on the Karatsu Line stop at all stations along the line, including through services from both sections of the Chikuhi Line. All trains that run to/from Kubota Station use the Nagasaki Main Line to terminate at Saga Station instead.

Station list
Station numbering has not been introduced for the Karatsu Line, but both  and  use the station numbering from the eastern section of the Chikuhi Line.

Rolling stock
KiHa 40/47 DMUs
KiHa 125 DMUs
103 series EMUs
303 series EMUs
305 series EMUs

History
In 1902, the company merged with the Kyushu Railway Co., which extended the line to Kubota in 1903. The company was nationalised in 1907. From 1898 to 1912, a number of freight only branch lines were also built.

The Chikuhi Line from Higashi-Karatsu was extended to Yamamoto in 1929 on an alignment paralleling the east bank of the Matsuura River.

In 1983, the Chikuhi line was rebuilt so it branched at Karatsu, with the Karatsu - Nishi-Karatsu section being electrified at 1,500 V DC at the same time in conjunction with the electrification of the Chikuhi line, together with CTC signalling from Nishi-Karatsu to Kubota.

The last of the freight only branch lines closed in 1982. Freight services ceased in 1986.

References

 
Lines of Kyushu Railway Company
1067 mm gauge railways in Japan
Railway lines opened in 1898